David Troughton (born 9 June 1950) is an English actor. He is known for his Shakespearean roles on the British stage and for his many roles on British television, including Dr Bob Buzzard in A Very Peculiar Practice and Ricky Hanson in New Tricks.

Early life and family
David Troughton was born in Hampstead, London. He comes from an acting family of Jewish ancestry. He is the son of Patrick Troughton, elder brother of Michael Troughton, and father of actors Sam Troughton and William Troughton. He attended Orange Hill Grammar School in Edgware with his brother Michael.  Another son is the Warwickshire cricketer Jim Troughton. Troughton is also an uncle of the actor Harry Melling.

Career
His memorable performances include King Richard in Richard III (RSC, 1996), Bolingbroke in Richard II (RSC, 2000) and Duke Vincentio in Measure for Measure (Théâtre de Complicité, 2004).

On television, his roles have included Ham Peggotty in David Copperfield; guest appearances in Survivors, The Life and Times of David Lloyd George, Rab C. Nesbitt and Doctor Who, first as an extra in The Enemy of the World (1967–1968), then as a soldier in The War Games (1969), both times alongside his father who played the Second Doctor, and in a considerably larger role as King Peladon in The Curse of Peladon (1972) alongside Jon Pertwee as the Third Doctor; as Sergeant Pritchard in the BBC television sitcom Hi-de-Hi! series 2 episode 12 and as Brinsley in the episode "Sons and Lovers" in Sorry!. In the television adaptation of Alan Ayckbourn's trilogy The Norman Conquests (1977), Troughton appeared as Tom, the veterinarian. During 1977/8 he starred as  Royal Flying Corps Observer Lieutenant Richard Bravington in two seasons of the television series Wings. Later he was the physician Bob Buzzard in the two series of A Very Peculiar Practice (1986 and 1988). Also in 1986, he appeared as himself in the ITV children's TV show Rainbow, appearing as the guest storyteller in the episode "What's Wrong with Bungle". He was Uncle Sid in Cider with Rosie (1998) and also appeared in the role of Sir Arthur Wellesley (the Duke of Wellington) in the first two episodes of Sharpe, a role which saw him share the screen once again with former Wings co-star Michael Cochrane who played Sir Henry Simmerson. He appeared as an alien hunter in the comedy/drama mini-series Ted and Alice in 2002, and in 2005 he also played Sgt. Clive Harvey, side-kick to the title character of the ITV detective show Jericho. He appeared in an episode of Agatha Christie's Poirot in 1993 ("The Yellow Iris"), and in two separate episodes of Midsomer Murders, in 1998 and 2007, playing two separate characters. He appeared in the first episode of the TV adaptation of The Last Detective in which his A Very Peculiar Practice co-star Peter Davison (also ex-Doctor Who) starred.

Troughton appeared in the TV film All the King's Men, playing King George V.

He appeared in the 2008 series of Doctor Who as Professor Hobbes, in the episode "Midnight". He has also performed in a Big Finish Doctor Who audio production titled Cuddlesome where he plays the Tinghus. He also played the Black Guardian in two audios: The Destroyer of Delights and The Chaos Pool. Finally, he returned as King Peladon in The Prisoner of Peladon audio, and in 2011 in The Crimes of Thomas Brewster.
He will reprise the role in 2022’s Peladon audio collection. 

In 2011, it was announced that David Troughton would be taking on his father's role as the Second Doctor in two audio plays, also featuring Tom Baker as the Fourth Doctor. He has also performed regularly as a notable villain in the BBC series New Tricks. In the same year he appeared (uncredited) in the US remake of The Girl with the Dragon Tattoo alongside Daniel Craig.

He toured alongside Alison Steadman in a production of Enjoy by Alan Bennett, playing the role of Dad. He starred alongside Kevin Spacey in a production of Inherit the Wind by Jerome Lawrence and Robert Edwin Lee at London's Old Vic theatre which ran from 18 September to 20 December 2009.

In 2011, he appeared as Stan Astill in the Sky1 comedy series The Café. In 2012, he guest starred in an episode of Holby City as a character named Ritchie Mooney. Although they did not appear in the same episode, his real-life son Sam Troughton appeared five weeks later as his character's son Nick Mooney. In November 2013, Troughton appeared in the one-off 50th anniversary comedy homage The Five(ish) Doctors Reboot.

In January 2014, he took on the role of Tony Archer, from Colin Skipp who, for 46 years, had played the part in the BBC radio series The Archers. In November that year, fiction caught up with reality when his actor son, William Troughton, took over the role of Tom Archer, Tony Archer's son, from Tom Graham.

David Troughton played the role of Simon Eyre in The Shoemaker's Holiday for the Royal Shakespeare Company from 11 December 2014 to 7 March 2015; he also played the role of Gloucester in Gregory Doran's version of King Lear. He returned to the Company in 2017 to play the title role in Titus Andronicus, before playing Falstaff in The Merry Wives of Windsor in 2018.

Troughton co-starred with Fiona O'Shaughnessy in the romantic horror comedy film Nina Forever (2015).

Filmography

Film

References

External links
 
 Video – David Troughton in conversation at the RSC

1950 births
Living people
20th-century English male actors
21st-century English male actors
English male film actors
English male Shakespearean actors
English male stage actors
English male television actors
Male actors from London
People from Hampstead
Royal Shakespeare Company members
The Archers
Troughton family